James David Laughlin (born July 5, 1958) is a former American football player.  He played college football as a linebacker for the Ohio State Buckeyes. Laughlin was the eighth pick in the fourth round of the 1980 NFL Draft (91st overall) by the Atlanta Falcons.

Playing career
Laughlin played high school football at Charles F. Brush High School in his hometown of Lyndhurst, Ohio. He graduated from Charles F. Brush High school in 1976.

As a team captain during his senior year of 1979 at Ohio State, Laughlin (along with Mike D'Andrea) had a share in a blocked punt against Michigan, which was returned for what eventually proved to be the winning touchdown by Todd Bell. The play put the Buckeyes on top 18–15, sending the team to the 1980 Rose Bowl.  In 1979 Laughlin was the Buckeyes MVP and an Academic All-Big Ten Conference honoree.  He was also a 1979 winner of the National Football Foundation and Hall of Fame Scholarship, awarded annually to the top 13 players in college football.

References

1958 births
Living people
American football linebackers
Atlanta Falcons players
Green Bay Packers players
Los Angeles Rams players
Ohio State Buckeyes football players
Ohio State University alumni
Players of American football from Cleveland
National Football League replacement players